Derek Nash (born 28 July 1961) is a British jazz saxophonist, band leader and recording engineer.

For over forty years, Nash has led Sax Appeal, which won the John Dankworth Award for Ensemble in the 1998 B.T. Jazz Awards, and subsequently the British Jazz Award for best small group in 2000.
He Leads the Derek Nash acoustic Quartet that features David Newton - Piano, Geoff Gascoyne - Bass and Sebastiaan de Krom - Drums.
He also leads the funk/fusion band Protect the Beat and Latin band PICANTE.

He has been a member of the Jools Holland Rhythm and Blues Orchestra since 2004.

He is a member of the Ronnie Scotts Blues Explosion.

He co-leads the "Some Kinda Wonderful" Show a celebration of the music of Stevie Wonder with vocalist Noel McCalla and released an album “The music of Stevie Wonder” in 2021.

After studying electroacoustics at Salford University, Nash became a sound engineer at the BBC in 1982, leaving in 2002 to become a full-time musician and to set up his own Clowns Pocket Recording Studio.

Derek Nash's Clowns Pocket Recording Studio has been used by many British musicians to record, mix and master albums including Jamie Cullum, George Melly, Stan Tracey, Tony Remy, Georgie Fame, Dave O'Higgins, Evelina De Lain, Geoff Gascoyne and many others.

Nash has performed with David Sanborn, John Dankworth, Dick Morrissey, Spike Robinson, Humphrey Lyttelton, Paul McCartney, Eric Clapton, Solomon Burke, Annie Lennox, Eddie Floyd, Madeleine Peyroux, Roger Daltrey, Eddi Reader, Tom Jones, Don Grusin, Dave Grusin, John Etheridge, Russell Ferrante, Nelson Rangell, Snake Davis, Bob Dorough, Oscar Castro Neves, Clare Teal, Jamie Cullum, Alan Barnes, Axel Zwingenberger, Dave Green, Charlie Watts, George Melly, Bob Dorough, Shakatak, Lulu, India Arie, Alison Moyet, Clark Tracey, Alec Dankworth, Ben Waters, Digby Fairweather and Jools Holland.

The album he recorded with Spike Robinson, Young Lions, Old Tigers (2000), was named Best Jazz CD of the Year., a feat repeated in 2012 with his "Joyriding" album by the Derek Nash Acoustic Quartet. Both albums are released on JAZZIZIT Records and Nash is a co-director of the label.

Awards
Best Jazz CD of the Year for Joyriding with the Derek Nash Acoustic Quartet (2012)
Best Jazz CD of the Year for Young Lions, Old Tigers with Spike Robinson (2002)
British Jazz Award (Small Group) for Sax Appeal (2000)
John Dankworth Award for Ensemble in the B.T. Jazz awards (1998)

Nominations
Nominated for British Jazz Award Alto Saxophone 2019 (3rd)
Nominated for British Jazz Award Alto Saxophone 2017 (4th)
Nominated for British Jazz Award Alto Saxophone 2016 (4th)
Nominated for British Jazz Award Alto Saxophone 2015 (4th)
Nominated for British Jazz Award Alto Saxophone 2014 (5th)
Nominated for Jazz Musician of the Year by the Global Music Foundation and voted in the Top 3 Alto Saxophonists in the 2010 British Jazz Awards.

Discography

As leader/co-leader
2019: Down On Frenchmen Street – with Dave Newton, Geoff Gascoyne and Sebastiaan de Krom (Plus guest Martin Shaw)
2015: You've Got To Dig It To Dig It,You Dig? – with Dave Newton, Geoff Gascoyne and Sebastiaan de Krom (Plus guest Martin Shaw)
2012: Joyriding with Dave Newton, Geoff Gascoyne and Sebastiaan de Krom (Plus guests Martin Shaw and Winston Rollins)
2009: Snapshot – with Jan Lundgren, Geoff Gascoyne and Steve Brown
2000: Young Lions, Old Tigers – with Spike Robinson, Pete Cater, Nick Weldon, Rob Rickenberg
1998: Setting New Standards – with Clark Tracey, Alec Dankworth and Graham Harvey

With Sax Appeal 
2018: Big Bad Trouble
2014: Funkerdeen
2006: The Flatiron Suite 
2000: Take No Prisoners 
1997: Outside In
1994: Let's Go 
1991: Flat Out

With Protect the Beat
2007: Intrepid - with Darby Todd, Winston Blissett, Tim Cansfield, Arden Hart
2002: It Ain't Dinner Jazz - with Darby Todd, Winston Blissett, Tony Smith, Pete Adams

With PICANTE
2019: Bim Bam Bom  - with Dominic Ashworth, NeiL Angilley, Andy Staples, Marc Cecil, Chris Storr, Robin Jones, Satin Singh, Noel McCalla and Louise Marshall
2015: Five Note Salsa  - with Dominic Ashworth, Neil Angilley, Geoff Gascoyne, Marc Cecil, Chris Storr and Louise Marshall

With SOME KINDA WONDERFUL
2021: The Music Of Stevie Wonder  - with Noel McCalla, Neil Angilley, Tim Cansfield, Jonathan Noyce and Nic France

As sideman
With the Jools Holland Rhythm and Blues Orchestra
"Pianola" 2021
"A Lovely Life To Live" 2018
"As You See Me Now" 2017
"Piano" 2016
"Jools and Ruby" 2015
"Sirens of Song" 2014
"The Golden Age of Song" 2012
"Rockinghorse" 2010
"The Informer"  2008
"Best of Friends"  2007
"Moving Out to the Country" 2006
"Swinging the Blues, Dancing the Ska" 2005
"Tom Jones and Jools Holland" 2004

With Ben Waters
Shakin' in the Makin''' Hurricane Boogie for Stu''

References

1961 births
Living people
English jazz saxophonists
British male saxophonists
British male jazz musicians
English audio engineers
21st-century saxophonists
21st-century English male musicians
Jools Holland's Rhythm and Blues Orchestra members
Musicians from Greater Manchester